Jang Beom-june (born May 16, 1989) is a South Korean singer-songwriter. He debuted in 2011 on the music audition television program Superstar K 3 as a member of the indie rock trio Busker Busker. He released his self-titled, first solo album in 2014, which topped real-time music charts and included the No.1 hit single, "Difficult Woman." His second album, released in 2016, was similarly successful and spawned the No.1 hit, "Fallen In Love (Only With You)." After being discharged from his mandatory military service in 2018, Jang released his third album in 2019, which included the hit single "Every Moment With You." Later in 2019, his song, "Your Shampoo Scent In The Flowers," from the soundtrack to the television series Be Melodramatic, reached No. 1 on South Korean music charts.

Personal life 
Jang is married to actress Song Ji-soo. The couple has a daughter named Jang Jo-ah and a son named Jang Ha-da. The children have appeared on the South Korean variety show The Return of Superman alongside their father.

Discography

Studio albums

Singles

Soundtrack appearances

Other charted songs

Filmography

Television

Awards and nominations

Notes

References

External links 
 

1989 births
Living people
K-pop singers
South Korean singer-songwriters
South Korean male singers
Melon Music Award winners
Superstar K participants
South Korean male singer-songwriters